The Ministry of Health, is the government department responsible for managing the health system of Greece. The incumbent minister is Thanos Plevris of New Democracy.

Ministers for Health and Social Solidarity (2004–2012)

Ministers for Health (2012–2015)

Ministers for Health, Social Security and Social Solidarity (January 2015–September 2015)

Ministers of Health  (since September 2015)

See also
Health care in Greece
List of hospitals in Greece

External links
  

Health
Health
Greece
1982 establishments in Greece
Ministries established in 1982